"Signs" is a song by the Canadian rock group Five Man Electrical Band. It was written by the band's frontman, Les Emmerson, and popularized the relatively unknown band, who recorded it for their true first album, Good-byes and Butterflies, in 1970. The LP "Five Man Electrical Band" had begun as a Staccatos album with Brian Rading, the band's bassist suggesting the band's new name from the song title.

"Signs" was originally a 1970 B-side to the relatively unsuccessful single "Hello Melinda Goodbye" (#55 Canada). Re-released in 1971 as the A-side, "Signs" reached No. 4 in Canada and No. 3 on the US Billboard Hot 100 chart. Billboard ranked it as the No. 24 song for 1971.  It became a gold record. In Canada, RPM Magazine ranked it at No. 55, with Absolutely Right ranked No. 49.

Some radio edits have omitted the instrumental introduction and shortened the instrumental coda for airplay, due to time constraints.

Composition 

The song was written by Les Emmerson when he was road-tripping on Route 66 in California, and noticed the beautiful scenery was obscured by many billboards.

The song's narrator describes four instances of encountering signs that anger or concern him, as follows:

 A notice that "long-haired freaky people need not apply" for a job opening. He stuffs his hair into his hat in order to get an interview, then contemptuously reveals it once he has been offered the job.
 A sign outside a house warning that trespassers will be shot on sight. He climbs onto the perimeter fence and berates the owners for keeping people out and fencing in the land's natural beauty.
 Being told to leave a restaurant because he does not meet its dress code or have a membership card, both of which are displayed on a sign.
 A sign inviting people to worship at a church. When an offering is taken up at the end of the service, he makes a sign telling God that he is doing well, as he has no money to contribute.

Chart performance

Weekly charts

Year-end charts

Tesla version

"Signs" was covered and recorded live by Tesla for their Five Man Acoustical Jam album in 1990, peaking at number 8 on the Pop charts. The album version of the cover had some minor changes to the lyrics: the line "blockin' out the scenery" was changed to "fuckin' up the scenery," and "made up my own little sign" was changed to "made up my own fuckin' sign," whilst the single version retained the original lyrics for radio airplay. A studio version recorded in 2007, which appeared on the EP A Peace of Time, using the original lyrics.

Track listings
7" single

12" single

CD single

Chart performance

Other covers and samples
The opening line of the song, "And the sign said long haired freaky people need not apply", was sampled by Fatboy Slim for his song "Don't Let The Man Get You Down", from his Palookaville album.
ApologetiX recorded a parody of the song titled "Lions", telling a Biblical story of a character named Daniel in a lion's den. It was originally included on the cassette of Radical History Tour, and was later re-issued on the "Director's Cut" edition of Isn't Wasn't Ain't.
The Evolution Control Committee used only part of the song's opening line "the sign said long haired freaky people" on the track "Freaky People" from their 2011 album All Rights Reserved.

References

External links
 Signs Lyrics by Five Man Electrical Band
 

1970 songs
1971 singles
1990 singles
Environmental songs
Five Man Electrical Band songs
Geffen Records singles
Protest songs
Songs written by Les Emmerson
Tesla (band) songs